The Minister of Armaments and War Production was a position in the France cabinet during World War I (1914–18), and the Minister of Armaments (} was a cabinet post during and after World War II (1939–45).

Ministers

Sub-Secretaries of State

References

Sources

Government ministries of France
1916 establishments in France